The Society for Arts is an American 501 (c) (3) not-for-profit arts organization focused on furthering cultural communication between Europe and the United States. It was established in 1981, and is located in the East Village, what is considered to be one of Chicago's more artistic communities along Milwaukee Avenue in the heart of the old Polish Downtown. The organization is best known for organizing the Chicago International Documentary Festival.

Building
The structure housing the Society was originally designed as a neighborhood bank by the architectural firm of Whitney & Williams. It was built in 1920, and purchased along with adjacent lots for the Society in December 1993. It was officially opened on November 3, 1994. The Society currently operates two galleries within the building, with exhibits ranging from painting, sculpture, graphics and photography to three-dimensional installations, as well as gallery talks, workshops and lectures by visiting artists and scholars.

External links
 Homepage

Arts organizations established in 1981
1981 establishments in the United States
Arts organizations based in Illinois
Culture of Chicago
Art museums and galleries in Chicago
Polish-American culture in Chicago